Wietstock is a village in the Vorpommern-Greifswald district, in Mecklenburg-Vorpommern, Germany. It is part of the municipality Altwigshagen. Before 1 January 2011, it was an independent municipality.

References

Villages in Mecklenburg-Western Pomerania
Vorpommern-Greifswald